Philip Jonathan Clark (born 12 August 1979) is a former English cricketer. Clark is a right-handed batsman who bowls right-arm medium-fast. He was born at Khartoum in Sudan.

While studying for a degree at the University of Oxford, Clark made a single first-class appearance for Oxford UCCE against Worcestershire at University Parks in 2002. Clark took a single wicket in Worcestershire's first-innings total of 523/6 declared, that of Anurag Singh to finish with figures of 1/72 from thirteen overs. He was dismissed for a duck by Alamgir Sheriyar in Oxford UCCE's first-innings total of 145, while in Worcestershire's second-innings he bowled four wicketless overs in their total of 159/6. With a target of 538 to chase, Oxford UCCE could only manage 205 all out, with Clark ending that innings not out on 0. Worcestershire won the match by 332 runs. This was his only major appearance for Oxford UCCE.

References

External links
Philip Clark at ESPNcricinfo
Philip Clark at CricketArchive

1979 births
Living people
People from Khartoum
Alumni of the University of Oxford
English cricketers
Oxford MCCU cricketers